Lakshmi Priyaa Chandramouli is a National award winning Indian actress who predominantly works in Tamil and Malayalam films. A post graduate in human resource management from Madras School of Social Work, she joined the English theatre company Evam as a full-time employee, before venturing into the Tamil film industry. She is also a former National Level cricket player, and national Ultimate Frisbee champion.She has won National Film Award for Best Supporting Actress for her performance in  Sivaranjiniyum Innum Sila Pengalum

Early life
Lakshmi Priyaa Chandramouli was born into Tamil family. After completing her master's in social work, specialising in human resources, from the Madras School of Social Work, she worked for a corporate company as an HR professional. As she wanted to pursue "something more creative", she started to work with the theatre group Evam, on their managerial side. Although she never got to act in their plays because of a tight work schedule, she called it "a great platform where I could easily learn how things transformed from paper to performance".

She joined gymnastics before she was 10 years old and started playing cricket, becoming a part of India's B national cricket team, under which she also played a series against the West Indies. She also pursues Ultimate Frisbee. A member of Chennai Ultimate Frisbee, she has regularly participated at Ultimate Frisbee competitions.

Career
While selling tickets for one of Evam's plays, director Magizh Thirumeni approached and asked her to play a supporting role in his film Mundhinam Paartheney. She took leave from work and shot for ten days for the film. After working with director K. Balachander on one of his teleserials, and starting to audition for a role in the TV show, Dharmayudham, she decided to pursue acting full-time. She quit her job and attended several auditions for different roles in the show, eventually landing the role of Sharada. Her first film in a lead role was the black comedy Sutta Kadhai. She played a bold tribal girl called Silanthi in the film, which required her to perform stunts as well, and reviews on her performance were positive. Her sole 2014 release was Angels, which marked her Malayalam debut. Her next Tamil release was Kallappadam by debutant director Vadivel. About her role, she said that it was a "well defined and powerful character" and "emotionally very strong". Her portrayal of a retired actress, which Baradwaj Rangan described as the "most fascinating, refreshing character" in the film, was lauded by critics, with Sify stating that "Lakshmi Priya shines in the role". She has also played notable roles in films like Yagavarayinum Naa Kaakka, Kalam and Maya. she is national award winner also.

Filmography

Television

References

External links
 

Tamil television actresses
Tamil actresses
1984 births
Living people
Actresses in Malayalam cinema
Indian film actresses
Actresses in Tamil cinema
Actresses from Chennai
21st-century Indian actresses
Actresses in Tamil television
Best Supporting Actress National Film Award winners